Zarat may refer to:
Zarat Xeybəri, Azerbaijan
Zarat, Davachi, Azerbaijan
Zarat, Ismailli, Azerbaijan
Zarat, Shamakhi, Azerbaijan
Zarat, Siazan, Azerbaijan
Zarat, Iran
Zarat, Tunisia